Itebula is an administrative ward in Uvinza District of Kigoma Region in Tanzania. 
In 2016 the Tanzania National Bureau of Statistics report there were 27,305 people in the ward, from 24,807 in 2012.

Hamlets 
The ward has 6 hamlets.
 Itebula
 Kalemela
 Kamfuba
 Lugongoni
 Songati A
 Songati B

References

Wards of Kigoma Region